Dammaradiene synthase is an enzyme with systematic name squalene mutase (cyclizing, dammara-20,24-diene-forming). This enzyme catalyses the following chemical reaction: squalene  dammara-20,24-diene

References

External links 
 

EC 5.4.99